Jaguar Lives! is a 1979 American action film directed by Ernest Pintoff and starring Joe Lewis, Christopher Lee, Donald Pleasence and Barbara Bach. Its plot follows a secret agent who battles an international drugs ring.

Plot

Cast
Despite receiving top billing in the credits, stars such as Christopher Lee, Barbara Bach and Donald Pleasence barely feature in the narrative.

Production
Jaguar Lives! was the feature film debut of karate and kickboxing champion Joe Lewis and was planned as being the first in a series of action films featuring Lewis as special agent “Jonathan Cross.” Filming began on June 26, 1978 in Madrid, Spain.  The film was scheduled for six weeks in Spain and four weeks in other countries, including Japan, Germany, Turkey, Italy, and Hong Kong. The original film score was composed and conducted by Robert O. Ragland and recorded in London, England with the National Philharmonic Orchestra.

Release
Jaguar Lives! opened in Los Angeles on August 31, 1979.

Reception
From contemporary reviews, Paul Taylor of The Monthly Film Bulletin declared that the film would have been more attractive nine years ago and that "there are a few signs of Pintoff's quirky humour, but overall the film registers as a tacky chore." Taylor noted that “only Donald Pleasence rises to the bait of his over-the-top bit-part villain."

References

External links

1979 films
Films directed by Ernest Pintoff
1979 action films
Films shot in Madrid
American martial arts films
American spy films
Films shot in Almería
Films scored by Robert O. Ragland
1979 martial arts films
1970s English-language films
1970s American films